USS Somerset (AK-212) was an  that was constructed for the US Navy during the closing period of World War II.  She was later acquired by the US Army in 1946 and the US Air Force in 1957 before being reacquired by the USN as the USNS Coastal Sentry (T-AGM-15), a missile range instrumentation ship.

Construction
The third ship to be so named by the Navy, Somerset was laid down on 9 October 1944, under US Maritime Commission (MARCOM) contract, MC hull 2166, by the Leathem D. Smith Shipbuilding Company, Sturgeon Bay, Wisconsin; launched on 21 January 1945; sponsored by Mrs. Fred Bradley, wife of the Michigan congressman. Initially earmarked to be manned by a US Coast Guard crew, Somerset was completed at her building yard on 19 February 1945. After she successfully completed her MARCOM acceptance trials, a Navy sub-board of inspection and survey recommended preliminary acceptance on 22 February 1945.

US Navy service
Broken-down for the voyage via inland waterways, the ship arrived at New Orleans, Louisiana, on 2 May 1945, to be transferred to Pendleton Shipyards at New Orleans for reassembly. Accepted by the Navy on 20 September 1945 within a month of the Japanese surrender, Somerset began the conversion process to a cargo ship on 24 September. Ironically, her prospective commanding officer reported on 28 September that progress of the work was proceeding satisfactorily and that crew deficiencies caused by demobilization had been corrected, when, that same day, 28 September, the ship was earmarked for return to the MARCOM. Her assignment to the US Pacific Fleet was cancelled on 29 September. Her estimated commissioning date had been 15 October. Redelivered to the War Shipping Administration (WSA) at 1500 on 2 November 1945, Somerset was stricken from the Navy Register on 5 December 1945 never having been commissioned.

War Shipping Administration
On the same day the WSA received the cargo vessel, renamed Coastal Sentry, that agency transferred her to the Stockard Steamship Company at New Orleans. Transferred again, to the War Department, on 2 August 1946 at Baltimore, Maryland., the ship entered the Reserve Fleet, berthed at Suisun Bay, California, on 28 September 1949, with the US Army retaining her title. On 12 December 1949, however, Coastal Sentry was declared surplus.

Merchant service
The ship resumed commercial operation under the house flag of the Matson Navigation Company on 15 November 1951. Returned to the Reserve Fleet, this time at Astoria, Oregon, on 17 February 1954, Coastal Sentry was taken out of reserve status on 10 May 1955 to be operated by the West Coast Trans-Oceanic Steamship Line for the Military Sea Transportation Service (MSTS). Another stint of inactivity followed, 19 October 1955 – 22 May 1956, after which she again served under MSTS, this time with the Coastwise Line.

US Air Force service
Placed in reserve at Olympia, Washington, on 28 September 1956, Coastal Sentry was taken out of the Reserve Fleet on 29 March 1957. Retaining her name, she was operated by the US Air Force as a missile range instrumentation ship (AGM). Reacquired by the Navy on 1 July 1964 and reinstated on the Naval Vessel Register, Coastal Sentry was designated as T-AGM 15.

NASA service
As an example of that work, Coastal Sentry initiated the necessary re-entry command signals on the Gemini VIII mission when the capsule had to make an emergency landing in the Pacific on 17 March 1966. For the Gemini Program, she served as a primary tracking station, call sign CSQ, in the western Pacific.

Transferred to the Maritime Administration (the successor of MARCOM) on 11 July 1968, the ship was delivered the same day to the firm of Fuji Marden and Co., Ltd., of Hong Kong, British Crown Colony, at Fremantle, Australia, for scrapping. Coastal Sentry was stricken from the Naval Vessel Register on 9 October 1969.

Notes 

Citations

Bibliography 

Online resources

External links

Alamosa-class cargo ships
Ships built in Sturgeon Bay, Wisconsin
1945 ships
World War II merchant ships of the United States
Type C1-M ships of the United States Air Force
Type C1-M ships of the United States Navy
Cold War auxiliary ships of the United States
Signals intelligence
Missile range instrumentation ships of the United States Navy
Research vessels of the United States Navy
Maritime vessels related to spaceflight